Tambakha is a chiefdom of Bombali District in the Northern Province of Sierra Leone. The principal town lies at Fintonia.

In 2004, the chiefdom had a population of 17,675.

References

Chiefdoms of Sierra Leone
Northern Province, Sierra Leone